Budge's Shop is a hamlet in Cornwall, England. It is half a mile northwest of Trerulefoot. According to the Post Office the 2011 census population was included in the civil parish of St. Germans

References

Hamlets in Cornwall